is a nationally designated Place of Scenic Beauty in the city of Sukagawa, Fukushima Prefecture, Japan.

Overview
The Sukagawa Peony Garden was laid out in 1766 by Itō Yutono, a herbalist who brought peony seedlings from Settsu Province (currently Takarazuka, Hyōgo), in order to cultivate for their roots as an ingredient in Chinese herbal medicine. The gardens came into the hands of the Yaginuma family at the start of the Meiji period and were expanded both in area and in the varieties of peony under cultivation. It was designated as a National Place of Scenic Beauty in 1932. The gardens currently cover 10 hectares and contain an estimated 7000 plants in 290 species.

See also
 List of Places of Scenic Beauty of Japan (Fukushima)

References

External links

 official homepage
 Sukagawa City home page
Sukawagawa Tourist Information site

Gardens in Fukushima Prefecture
Sukagawa, Fukushima
Places of Scenic Beauty